Devipatnam mandal is one of the 64 mandals in Alluri Sitharama Raju District of Andhra Pradesh. As per census 2011, there are 46 villages in this mandal.

Demographics 
Devipatnam mandal has total population of 28,178 as per the 2011 Census out of which 13,669 are males while 314,509 are females. The average sex ratio is 1061. The total literacy rate is 60%.

Towns and villages

Villages 
1. A Veeravaram
2. Anguluru
3. China Ramanayyapeta
4. Chintalagudem
5. Choppakonda
6. Damanapalle
7. Dandangi
8. Devaram
9. Devipatnam
10. Donalanka
11. Gangavaram
12. Ganugulagondi
13. Gonduru
14. Gumpanapalle
15. Indukuru
16. Indukurupeta
17. Katchuluru
18. Kondamodalu
19. Kothagudem
20. Kothapalle
21. Kudakarayi
22. Lakshmipuram
23. Lingavaram
24. Lothupalem
25. Maddirathigudem
26. Mamidivalasa
27. Manturu
28. Mulagalagudem
29. Nelakota
30. Nereduvalasa
31. Paluru
32. Pamugandi
33. Peda Bheempalle
34. Peddanuthulu
35. Pedduru
36. Pothavaram
37. Pudipalli
38. Ravilanka
39. Rayavaram
40. Sarabhavaram
41. Thatiwada
42. Thoyyeru
43. Thummuru
44. V Ramannapalem
45. Velagapall
46. Yerrametla

See also 
List of mandals in Andhra Pradesh

References 

Mandals in Alluri Sitharama Raju district